American singer Jacob Sartorius has released five extended plays, and 17 singles. Sartorius has not had chart success since the release of his second single in 2016.

Extended plays

Singles

Promotional singles
 "Hang Me Out to Dry" (2017)
 "Popular Girls" (2017)
 "Hooked on a Feeling" (2018)

Music videos

References

Discographies of American artists
Pop music discographies